Port Gibson United Methodist Church is a historic United Methodist church located at Port Gibson in Ontario County, New York. The church was constructed in 1871 and is an imposing example of Romanesque Revival style.  The front facade features a square, frame bell tower surmounted by a soaring, slate clad octagonal spire.

It was listed on the National Register of Historic Places in 1996.

References

Churches on the National Register of Historic Places in New York (state)
Romanesque Revival church buildings in New York (state)
Churches completed in 1871
19th-century Methodist church buildings in the United States
Churches in Ontario County, New York
National Register of Historic Places in Ontario County, New York